Petrache Poenaru, formerly known as Semănătoarea is a metro station in Bucharest, Romania, servicing the Bucharest Metro  Line M1. It was named after Semănătoarea, an agricultural machinery factory located in the vicinity, but it is now named after Petrache Poenaru, a Romanian inventor of the Enlightenment era.  The metro station services both what is left of the factory (that was severely downsized a number of times), part of the Regie student campus located in the vicinity, the Sema Park industrial Park, as well as some newly built residential areas.

The station was designed with relatively little traffic in mind; it has a central-track design with two narrow platforms on each side of the tracks. The station opened on 19 November 1979, initially as a temporary terminus of the first subway line of Bucharest, making it one of the initial 6 stations of the Bucharest Metro to enter commercial service, from Semănătoarea to Timpuri Noi. On 22 December 1984, the line was extended further to Crângași. It is also located close to the Semănătoarea (Ciurel) Metro Depot.

The walls of the Petrache Poenaru metro station are made of yellow and beige tiles with the floor being built in uniform yellow mosaic pieces. The station entrance is unusual in that it faces the street at an angle of 90 degrees and is just a few metres from the road. It was one of the least used stations in the city at some point, but recently, industrial and residential projects in the area have increased the station's usage.

References

External links
Cotidianul "1.200 de apartamente in loc de Semănătoarea", 8 March 2006

Semanatoarea
Railway stations opened in 1979
1979 establishments in Romania